"Glory of the 80's" is a song by American singer-songwriter Tori Amos. It is the fourth track on Amos' 1999 album To Venus and Back.  It was issued as the first single from the album in Europe and Australasia. Part one of the single was released in Australia on October 11, 1999, and both parts were released a month later in Europe and the UK on November 1, 1999.  The song reached #46 on the UK singles chart, having the lowest debut since her 1994 single God when both parts of the single were recalled early for a misprint in the credits. In Australia, the single peaked at #81 on the ARIA singles chart, becoming Amos' final single to reach the top 100 there.

About
"Glory of the 80's" is an electronically driven song with a dark, club-like atmosphere. The song also marks the final appearance of the harpsichord in Amos' work until her 2009 holiday album Midwinter Graces.

According to Amos, the song was written about the honesty of that decade, compared to the more conservative 1990s of censorship and political correctness.

Tori on the inspiration of the song:

Music video
The video for "Glory of the 80's" was directed by Erick Ifergan and shot in September 1999 in Los Angeles at Universal Studios and later aired on MTV Europe.

The video features Amos in Goth attire and make-up, trapped in a cubical torture chamber, with heavy cable bars fastened on her dress to the frame of the cage. Throughout the video, a shuriken is seen randomly but consistently flying around, slashing the cables, eventually freeing Amos from her prison. She is also seen sprouting black wings, and shape-shifting into various forms, including a raven.

Track listing
Two versions of the single were issued containing different live tracks. UK copies of the second disc mistakenly contained the same music as the first, rather than the tracks listed on their packaging and labels.

Part 1 Single
Glory of the 80's (4:01)
Famous Blue Raincoat (Live) (5:24)
Twinkle (Live) (2:48)

Part 2 Single
Glory of the 80's (4:01)
Baker Baker (Live) (3:53)
Winter (Live) (7:01)

Personnel

Tori Amos – Bösendorfer piano, synthesizers, harpsichord, vocals
Steve Caton – guitar
Jon Evans – bass
Matt Chamberlain – drums, percussion

Charts

Notes

Tori Amos songs
1999 singles
Songs written by Tori Amos
Atlantic Records singles
1999 songs